Katarína Garajová (born 21 July 1987) is a Slovak cross-country skier. She competed in the women's sprint at the 2006 Winter Olympics.

Cross-country skiing results
All results are sourced from the International Ski Federation (FIS).

Olympic Games

World Championships

World Cup

Season standings

References

External links
 

1987 births
Living people
Slovak female cross-country skiers
Olympic cross-country skiers of Slovakia
Cross-country skiers at the 2006 Winter Olympics
People from Planá